The Roger Kellaway Trio is an album by jazz pianist Roger Kellaway recorded for the Prestige label in 1965.

Reception

The AllMusic site awarded the album 4 stars stating "the 26-year-old shows off impressive technique, a swinging style, and the willingness to experiment... A frequently intriguing early set by the talented pianist".

Track listing
All compositions by Roger Kellaway except as indicated
 "Organ Morgan" (Patte Hale) – 2:41  
 "One Night Stand" – 3:08  
 "I'll Follow the Sun" (John Lennon, Paul McCartney) – 6:00  
 "Brats" – 5:40  
 "Can't You See It" (Lee Adams, Charles Strouse) – 2:36  
 "Sweet and Lovely" (Gus Arnheim, Jules LeMare, Harry Tobias) – 3:33  
 "Sigma: O.N." – 4:08  
 "Ballad of the Sad Young Men" (Fran Landesman, Tommy Wolf) – 4:33  
 "No More" (Adams, Strouse) – 2:51  
 "The Fall of Love" (Dimitri Tiomkin, Ned Washington) – 5:20

Personnel
Roger Kellaway – piano
Russell George – bass 
Dave Bailey – drums

Production
 Lew Futterman – producer

References

Roger Kellaway albums
1965 albums
Prestige Records albums